They Never Come Back is a 1932 American pre-Code drama film directed by Fred C. Newmeyer and starring Regis Toomey and Dorothy Sebastian.

Plot summary
Distracted just before the fight by the news that his mother has died, boxer Jimmy Nolan is defeated in the ring. As he and his sister Mary attend the funeral, Jimmy also deals with an injured arm from the fight.

At a nightclub Jerry Filmore owns, Jimmy meets dancer Adele, who is Filmore's romantic interest as well. A ticket taker at the door, Ralph Landon, takes $500 from the till and plants it on Jimmy, framing him. Jimmy goes to jail.

Ralph falls in love with Mary and confides to her that he owed $1,000 to Filmore and set up her brother on his behalf. Jimmy gets out of jail, accepts a fight and wins a $1,000 prize, settling Ralph's account with Filmore. It leads to a fistfight between the two men. Jimmy wins that one as well.

Cast
Regis Toomey as Jimmy Nolan
Dorothy Sebastian as Adele Landon
Edward Woods as Ralph Landon
Greta Granstedt as Mary Nolan
Earle Foxe as Jerry Filmore
Gertrude Astor as Kate
James J. Jeffries as First Referee
George Byron as Eddie Donovan
Jack Richardson as Hank Bates

External links

1932 films
1930s sports drama films
American black-and-white films
American boxing films
American sports drama films
1930s English-language films
Films directed by Fred C. Newmeyer
1930s American films